The 1909 VPI football team represented the Virginia Agricultural and Mechanical College and Polytechnic Institute in the 1909 college football season. Led by first-year head coach Branch Bocock, the team went 6–1 and claims a Southern championship. Tech outscored its opponents 148 to 27. The starting lineup averaged 172 pounds. This is the first season the team was referred to in print as the "Gobblers", and it became the official nickname in 1912.

Schedule

Players
The following players were members of the 1909 football team according to the roster published in the 1910 edition of The Bugle, the Virginia Tech yearbook.

Season summary

Clemson

VPI opened its season with the Clemson Tigers, winning 6–0. "Hughes, playing quarter for the first time, starred for V. P. I." Hughes got the touchdown when he picked up a fumble.

VPI's starting lineup was: Sharpe (left end), Jones (left tackle), E. Hodgson (left guard), Gibbs (center), Burrass (right guard), Norris (right tackle), Hicks (right end), Hughes (quarterback), Davis (left halfback), Luttrell (right halfback), Leggs (fullback).

at Princeton

VPI's strongest showing came in the close loss to Ivy League powerhouse Princeton. In a game plagued by frigid weather conditions, each side scored due to a fumble by the opposition. Princeton's Logan Cunningham scored a touchdown (worth five points in 1909) in the first two minutes of play after VPI fumbled the ball away on its own 10-yard line. Princeton missed the extra point attempt. Later in the contest, a snap from center went over the Princeton quarterback's head, and Tech’s Hoss Hodgson returned the lost fumble 50 yards for a touchdown. Hodgson then made his own extra point. After VPI led 6 to 5 for some time, and with only minutes left to play, Princeton's Cunningham made 30-yard drop kick to secure the 8 to 6 victory.

VPI's starting lineup was: Luttrell (left end), Burruss (left tackle), Jones (left guard), Gibbes (center), E. Hodgson (right guard), Norris (right tackle), Hicks (right end), Hughes (quarterback), Davis (left halfback), Billups (right halfback), V. Hodgson (fullback).

at Richmond

Sources:

VPI rolled up the season's largest score on the Richmond Spiders, winning  52–0  and playing well on both sides of the ball, especially the offense. The backfield starred in a game of conventional football.

VPI's starting lineup was: A. Hodgson (left end), Burruss (left tackle), Pitts (left guard), Gibbes (center), E. Hodgson (right guard), Norris (right tackle), Hicks (right end), Hughes (quarterback), Davis (left halfback), Billups (right halfback), V. Hodgson (fullback).

Washington & Lee

Sources:

VPI "buried" the Washington and Lee Generals by a 34–5 score. Hughes' 65-yard touchdown run and Hoss Hodgson's punting and kicking featured. Fullback Anderson starred for the Generals. The big win was surprising.

VPI's starting lineup was: Luttrell (left end), Burruss (left tackle), Pitts (left guard), Gibbs (center), E. Hodgson (right guard), Norris (right tackle), Hicks (right end), Hughes (quarterback), Davis (left halfback), Billups (right halfback), V. Hodgson (fullback).

North Carolina

Sources:

Hodgson starred in a closely contested game between VPI and the Tar Heels, making a field goal in the second half to lead VPI to a 15–0 win.

VPI's starting lineup was: Luttrell (left end), Burruss (left tackle), Jones (left guard), Gibbs (center), E. Hodgson (right guard), Norris (right tackle), Hicks (right end), Hughes (quarterback), Legge (left halfback), A. Hodgson (right halfback), V. Hodgson (fullback).

George Washington

Sources:

VPI won over the defending Southern champion George Washington Hatchetites in Washington, D. C. 17–8. Hodgson's punting again featured. The weather was much better than last year.

VPI's starting lineup was: Luttrell (left end), Burruss (left tackle), E. Hodgson (left guard), Gibbs (center), Jones (right guard), Norris (right tackle), Hicks (right end), Hughes (quarterback), Davis (left halfback), Billups (right halfback), V. Hodgson (fullback).

North Carolina A&M (Now known as N.C. State)

Sources:

VPI defeated the North Carolina Aggies, (now known as N.C. State) 18–5. Despite the 18–5 score, VPI had to play aggressively throughout. The first score came twelve minutes into the first half, Vivian Hodgson going over. Later, on a fake kick, Luttrell ran 30 yards around left end. The A&M squad followed Hoss Hodgson's helmet, which he tossed as if it were a kicked ball.

The last touchdown came on a new trick play from coach Bocock, apparently similar to a statue of liberty play. Vivian Hodgson prepared to pass, and Hughes took it out of his suspended hand and ran 75 yards for a touchdown. North Carolina's Aggies showed fight in the second half.

VPI's starting lineup was: Luttrell (left end), Burruss (left tackle), Massie (left guard), Gibbs (center), E. Hodgson (right guard), Norris (right tackle), Hicks (right end), Hughes (quarterback), A. Hodgson (left halfback), Billups (right halfback), V. Hodgson (fullback).

Postseason
VPI claimed a Southern championship at year's end.

References

VPI
Virginia Tech Hokies football seasons
VPI football